Thomas L. Monahan III is Chief Executive Officer and President of DeVry University, a for-profit higher education institution. He previously served as Chief Executive Officer of CEB, which was acquired by Gartner, before resigning in 2017. He also serves as chairman of ProKarma and a board member of Transunion.

Early life and education 
He holds degrees from Harvard University and New York University Stern School of Business.

Career 
Prior to 1996, Monahan served as a senior consultant at the Deloitte & Touche Consulting Group, a director at the Committee for Economic Development, and a staff consultant at Andersen Consulting.

Monahan joined the leadership team of CEB (formerly the Corporate Executive Board) in 1996. He was named its chief executive in 2005 and chairman in 2008. He presided over an expansion of revenue, which increased 157% from 2005 to 2016. During his term, CEB acquired Evanta Ventures, a Portland-based best practice insight and technology company.  CEB was acquired by Gartner in 2017 for $2.6 billion. He stepped down from CEB Inc. in June 2017.

Monahan serves as chairman of ProKarma and a board member of Transunion. In August 2020, he was appointed president and CEO of DeVry University.

He has contributed several articles on business topics, including for CNBC, Fortune, and Harvard Business Review. He authored a column in The Washington Post called “Talent Matters."

Personal life 
Monahan is married to Sharon Kerrie Marcil, who graduated from Duke University and received an M.B.A. from Harvard University. Marcil is the North America regional chair at the Boston Consulting Group.

References 

Year of birth missing (living people)
Living people
DeVry University
Heads of universities and colleges in the United States
New York University Stern School of Business alumni
Harvard University alumni